Booze may refer to:

 Alcoholic beverage, by slang
 Booze, North Yorkshire, a hamlet in England
 Booze (surname), a surname (including a list of people with the name)

See also
 Boos (disambiguation)
 Booz (disambiguation)
 Boozer (disambiguation)
 Boozeville, Georgia, an unincorporated community in the United States
 Boza, a fermented beverage